The 2002–03 Liechtenstein Cup was the fifty-eighth season of Liechtenstein's annual cup competition. Seven clubs competed with a total of sixteen teams for one spot in the qualifying round of the UEFA Cup. Defending champions were FC Vaduz, who have won the cup continuously since 1998.

First round

|colspan="3" style="background-color:#99CCCC; text-align:center;"|24 September 2002

|-
|colspan="3" style="background-color:#99CCCC; text-align:center;"|25 September 2002

|-
|colspan="3" style="background-color:#99CCCC; text-align:center;"|1 October 2002

|-
|colspan="3" style="background-color:#99CCCC; text-align:center;"|2 October 2002

|}

Quarterfinals 

|colspan="3" style="background-color:#99CCCC; text-align:center;"|22 October 2002

|-
|colspan="3" style="background-color:#99CCCC; text-align:center;"|6 November 2002

|}

Semifinals 

|colspan="3" style="background-color:#99CCCC; text-align:center;"|8 April 2003

|-
|colspan="3" style="background-color:#99CCCC; text-align:center;"|21 April 2003

|}

Final

External links 
Official site of the LFV
RSSSF page

Liechtenstein Football Cup seasons
Cup
Liechtenstein Cup